Svenska Cupen 2007 ("Swedish Cup" 2007) was played March 24-September 27, 2007. Kalmar FF won the final with a 3-0 win against IFK Göteborg at Fredriksskans.

First round

!colspan="3"|24 March 2007

|-
!colspan="3"|28 March 2007

|-
!colspan="3"|31 March 2007

|-
!colspan="3"|1 April 2007

|-
!colspan="3"|4 April 2007

|-
!colspan="3"|5 April 2007

|-
!colspan="3"|6 April 2007

|-
!colspan="3"|7 April 2007

|-
!colspan="3"|8 April 2007

|-
!colspan="3"|9 April 2007

|-
!colspan="3"|11 April 2007

|-
!colspan="3"|14 April 2007

|}

Second round

!colspan="3"|19 April 2007

|-
!colspan="3"|24 April 2007

|-
!colspan="3"|25 April 2007

|-
!colspan="3"|26 April 2007

|-
!colspan="3"|1 May 2007

|-
!colspan="3"|2 May 2007

|}

Third round

!colspan="3"|15 May 2007

|-
!colspan="3"|16 May 2007

|-
!colspan="3"|17 May 2007

|-
!colspan="3"|23 May 2007

|-
!colspan="3"|24 May 2007

|-
!colspan="3"|6 June 2007

|}

Fourth round

!colspan="3"|5 June 2007

|-
!colspan="3"|13 June 2007

|-
!colspan="3"|14 June 2007

|-
!colspan="3"|20 June 2007

|-
!colspan="3"|28 June 2007

|-
!colspan="3"|5 July 2007

|}

Quarter-finals

Semi-finals

Final

References

 

2007
Cupen
2007 domestic association football cups